HMS Yaxham was one of 93 ships of the  of inshore minesweepers.

Their names were all chosen from villages ending in -ham. The minesweeper was named after Yaxham in Norfolk.

Became survey vessel HMS Woodlark, 1964. Her final years were as the Southampton University Royal Naval Unit's training vessel. This unit now has , a P2000 .

Notes

References
Blackman, R.V.B. ed. Jane's Fighting Ships (1953)

 

Ham-class minesweepers
Royal Navy ship names
1958 ships
Ships built on the Isle of Wight